Mica is an unincorporated community in Cherokee County, in the U.S. state of Georgia.

History
A post office called Mica was established in 1874, and remained in operation until 1904. The community was so named for the mica mines near the original town site.

References

Unincorporated communities in Cherokee County, Georgia